Plake may refer to:

Glen Plake (born 1964), American skier
Hunter Plake (born 1995), American singer and songwriter
Plake (Mysia), a town of ancient Mysia, Anatolia